Abies holophylla, also called needle fir or Manchurian fir, is a species of fir native to mountainous regions of northern Korea, southern Ussuriland, and China in the provinces of Heilongjiang, Jilin, and Liaoning.

The bark is scaly and gray-brown with resin blisters.

They spread on two sides, but not flat like for example in silver fir. Usually they more or less rise up forming with the shoot a V-shape empty compartment above it. Unlike in silver fir, the leaves here are sharp and prickly, without any indentation at the top.

They are bright green above and whitish-green below with 2 whitish strips, each of which is formed by 7–10 wax-covered stomatal bands. The shoots are glabrous, shiny yellow-gray when young and turning gray-brown. The scale bracts are hidden under the cone scales.

Manchurian fir is sometimes, but not commonly, used as an ornamental plant.

Gallery

References

External links
 Flora of China
 Gymnosperm Database
 UConn Plant Database

holophylla
Flora of the Russian Far East
Flora of Manchuria
Flora of Korea
Trees of China
Trees of Korea
Trees of Siberia